Cherryl Walker is professor of sociology in the Department of Sociology and Social Anthropology at Stellenbosch University, which she joined in 2005,  and is DSI/NRF SARChI Chair in the Sociology of Land, Environment and Sustainable Development at Stellenbosch since 2016. She is an authority on South African society - specialising in South Africa's land redistribution/restitution, land reform, gender and cosmopolitanism, and environmental sociology.

She was the  Commissioner of Regional Land Claims in KwaZulu–Natal from 1995 to 2000.

Education
She earned a Masters from the University of Cape Town in 1978.

Select publications

Books

Journal articles

References

External links

South African sociologists
South African women sociologists
South African anthropologists
South African women anthropologists
Academic staff of Stellenbosch University
South African social scientists
University of Cape Town alumni